Tisechu (also, Tis-e-chu and Tishech) is a former Choinimni settlement in Fresno County, California.

It was located near the confluence of Kings River and Mill Creek; its precise location is unknown.

The Choinimni were a branch of the Yokuts people.

References

  

Former Native American populated places in California
Former populated places in California
Former settlements in Fresno County, California
Lost Native American populated places in the United States